Douglas Blackwell Monypenny (28 May 1878 – 22 February 1900, in Paardeberg) was a Scottish international rugby player,

Rugby Union career

Amateur career

He played for London Scottish FC.

Provincial career

Monypenny played for the Anglo-Scots in 1898.

International career

Death

Monypenny was killed in the Second Boer War, and is the only Scottish rugby internationalist known to have died in either conflict. He was twenty one at the time.

References

Sources

 Bath, Richard (ed.) The Scotland Rugby Miscellany (Vision Sports Publishing Ltd, 2007 )
 Massie, Allan A Portrait of Scottish Rugby (Polygon, Edinburgh)

1878 births
1900 deaths
British Army personnel of the Second Boer War
British military personnel killed in the Second Boer War
London Scottish F.C. players
Loyal Regiment officers
People educated at Fettes College
Rugby union players from Fife
Scotland international rugby union players
Scottish Exiles (rugby union) players
Scottish rugby union players
Seaforth Highlanders officers
Rugby union centres